Jastarnia  is a resort town in Puck County, Pomeranian Voivodship, northern Poland. It is located on the Hel Peninsula on the Baltic Sea. It is a popular Polish seaside resort and small fishing port.

The municipal commune of Jastarnia consists of three districts: Jastarnia, Kuźnica, Jurata.

International relations

Jastarnia is twinned with:

References

Gallery

External links

Official website of Jastarnia
Official website of Jurata
Official website of Kuźnica

Cities and towns in Pomeranian Voivodeship
Puck County